The 2019 Sudamérica Rugby Sevens was the thirteenth edition of the Sudamérica Rugby Sevens, the continental championship for rugby sevens in South America. The competition took place as a series over two legs, the first tournament at Punta del Este in Uruguay, and the second at Viña del Mar in Chile.

 won both tournaments to take out the series title and gain entry to the USA Sevens and Canada Sevens in 2019, as well as a berth at the inaugural Challenger Series for a chance to qualify to the World Sevens Series in 2020–21.

 finished fourth in the series and also gained a berth at the Challenger Series as the next highest-placed team from Sudamérica not already in the World Series.

Teams
Twelve teams competed in the series, six teams from the Sudamérica Rugby region together with six invited international teams. 

Notes:

Series standings
Final standings over the two legs of the series:

Punta del Este Sevens
The first leg of the series was held on 5–6 January 2019.

All times are in Uruguay Standard Time (UTC−03:00)

Placings

Source: Sudamerica Rugby

Pool stage

Group A

Group B

Group C

Knockout stage

9th–12th bracket

5th–8th bracket

Cup

Source: Sudamerica Rugby

Viña del Mar Sevens
The second leg of the series was held on 12–13 January 2019.

All times are in Chile Summer Time (UTC−03:00)

Placings

Pool stage

Group A

Group B

Group C

Source: Sudamerica Rugby

Knockout stage

9th–12th bracket

5th–8th bracket

Cup

References

2019 rugby sevens competitions
2019 in South American rugby union
Rugby sevens competitions in South America
International rugby union competitions hosted by Chile
International rugby union competitions hosted by Uruguay
Punta Del Este Sevens
2019 in Chilean sport
2019 in Uruguayan sport
January 2019 sports events in South America